The Honoris Crux (Cross of Honour) of 1952, post-nominal letters HC, is a military decoration for bravery which was instituted by the Union of South Africa in 1952. It was in use from 1952 to 1975 and was awarded to members of the South African Defence Force for gallantry in action against the enemy in the field. It was discontinued on 1 July 1975, when it was replaced by a new set of four Honoris Crux decorations, in four classes.

The South African military
The Union Defence Forces (UDF) were established in 1912 and renamed the South African Defence Force (SADF) in 1958. On 27 April 1994, it was integrated with six other independent forces into the South African National Defence Force (SANDF).

Institution
The Honoris Crux of 1952, post-nominal letters HC, was instituted by Queen Elizabeth II on 6 April 1952, during the Tercentenary Van Riebeeck Festival.

Award criteria

The Honoris Crux of 1952 was awarded for gallantry in action against the enemy in the field. A Bar could be awarded for a further similar deed of bravery. Only five awards were made, the first in 1973 and the others in 1974 and 1975, all to helicopter pilots and flight engineers of the South African Air Force. The first decoration was awarded to Captain A.P. (Aap) Möller. No bar to the decoration was ever awarded.

Order of wear

With effect from 6 April 1952, when the Honoris Crux and several other new decorations and medals were instituted, these new awards took precedence before all earlier British orders, decorations and medals awarded to South Africans, with the exception of the Victoria Cross, which still took precedence before all other awards. The other older British awards continued to be worn in the order prescribed by the British Central Chancery of the Orders of Knighthood.

The position of the Honoris Crux of 1952 in the official order of precedence was revised twice after 1975, to accommodate the inclusion or institution of new decorations and medals. These revisions took place upon the integration into the South African National Defence Force in 1994, and upon the institution of a new set of awards in 2003.

South African Defence Force until 26 April 1994
  
Official SADF order of precedence:
 Preceded by the Louw Wepener Decoration (LWD).
 Succeeded by the Honoris Crux Silver (HCS).
Official national order of precedence:
 Preceded by the Railways Police Cross for Valour.
 Succeeded by the Honoris Crux Silver (HCS).

South African National Defence Force from 27 April 1994
  
Official SANDF order of precedence:
 Preceded by the Gallantry Cross, Gold of the Republic of Venda.
 Succeeded by the Honoris Crux Silver (HCS) of the Republic of South Africa.
Official national order of precedence:
 Preceded by the Railways Police Cross for Valour of the Republic of South Africa.
 Succeeded by the Honoris Crux Silver (HCS) of the Republic of South Africa.

The position of the Honoris Crux of 1952 in the order of precedence remained unchanged, as it was on 27 April 1994, when a new series of military orders, decorations and medals was instituted on 27 April 2003.

Description
Obverse
The Honoris Crux of 1952 is a silver-gilt Maltese cross which fits in a 45 millimetres diameter circle, with the arms of the cross in green enamel and with four eagles between the arms, all looking towards their right, with a roundel in the centre tierced horizontally in enameled orange, white and blue bands which represent the national flag and framed in a red circle inscribed "HONORIS CRUX". The cross is suspended from a laurel wreath, in the form of a circular ribbon hanger, with the leaves in green enamel.

Reverse
The reverse has the pre-1994 South African Coat of Arms, with the decoration number stamped at the bottom on the rim. Specimens which were minted before South Africa became a republic in 1961, had Queen Elizabeth's royal cipher (E II R) above the Coat of Arms. The royal cipher was removed in 1961, but without relocating the coat of arms to the centre of the decoration.

Ribbon
The ribbon is 32 millimetres wide, with a 3 millimetres wide red band, a 2 millimetres wide white band, a 22 millimetres wide dark green band, a 2 millimetres wide white band and a 3 millimetres wide red band.

Bar

The Bar to denote a subsequent award of the decoration, is 32 millimetres wide and silver-gilt, in its centre an eagle, similar to those between the arms of the cross on the decoration itself. When only ribbon bars are worn, a recipient of a subsequent award would have worn a silve-gilt button depicting this eagle, 8 millimetres in diameter, on the ribbon bar.

Discontinuation
Conferment of the decoration was discontinued in respect of services performed on or after 1 July 1975, when the Honoris Crux of 1952 was replaced by a new set of four Honoris Crux decorations, in four classes.

Recipients

References

Military decorations and medals of South Africa
Courage awards
1952 establishments in South Africa
Awards established in 1952